Ivan Ilić (born August 14, 1978) is a Serbian-American pianist. He lives in Paris.

Early life
Ilić was born in Palo Alto, in the United States. He attended the University of California, Berkeley in the U.S. where he took degrees in mathematics and music. Ilić also briefly studied at the San Francisco Conservatory of Music before pursuing graduate studies at the Conservatoire de Paris, earning a Premier  Prix, and finally at the École Normale de Musique de Paris. His teachers in France included François-René Duchâble, Christian Ivaldi, and Jacques Rouvier.

Career

Ilić performs primarily as a soloist. His recording of Debussy's 24 Préludes was released in October 2008 on the French record label Paraty and won Mezzo TV's Critics' Choice Award in France. The disc was also a Top Five CD of the year by a critic at Fanfare Magazine and a Top Five CD of the Month by the French website Classique News. Ilić rearranged the order of the Préludes on the album, a controversial choice which he defended in several interviews.

Ilić's next album was dedicated to the left-hand Studies on Chopin's Études by Leopold Godowsky. The disc was the Classical CD of the Week of The Daily Telegraph, a Top 5 CD of Mitteldeutscher Rundfunk Figaro, and a Top 5 CD of Classique News.

Ilić has performed at Carnegie Hall, Weill Hall in New York, Wigmore Hall, Glenn Gould Studio, and Ireland's National Concert Hall.

Discography
 Ivan Ilić, pianiste - oeuvres de Brahms, Beethoven et Chopin, Mairie de Paris
 Elegance and Refinement - Baroque Suites, French Sweets, Magnatune
 Fugitive Visions - Piano Masterworks by Chopin and Liszt, Magnatune
 Romantic - Powerful Miniatures by Schumann and Brahms, Magnatune
 Vitality and Virtuosity - Sonatas by Haydn and Beethoven, Magnatune
 Transcendental - Transcriptions by Brahms and Godowsky, Magnatune
 Claude Debussy - Préludes pour piano, Livres 1 et 2, Paraty
 Leopold Godowsky - 22 Chopin Studies, Paraty
 The Transcendentalist - Works by Scriabin, Feldman, Cage, and Wollschleger, Heresy Records
 Ivan Ilić plays Morton Feldman - For Bunita Marcus, Paraty
 Reicha Rediscovered, Volume 1 - Works by Antoine Reicha, Chandos Records
 Reicha Rediscovered, Volume 2 - Works by Antoine Reicha, Chandos Records
 Ivan Ilić plays Haydn - Symphonies transcribed by Carl David Stegmann, Chandos Records
 Reicha Rediscovered, Volume 3 - Works by Antoine Reicha, Chandos Records

Acting
In 2010 Ilić acted in Luc Plissonneau's short film, Izak's Choice.

References

External links
Ivan Ilić's website
A Radio France interview

1978 births
Living people
Conservatoire de Paris alumni
American classical pianists
Male classical pianists
American male pianists
American expatriates in France
American male film actors
American people of Serbian descent
École Normale de Musique de Paris alumni
University of California, Berkeley alumni
21st-century classical pianists
21st-century American male musicians
21st-century American pianists